Lost in the Dark is a 1947 Italian melodrama film directed by Camillo Mastrocinque. It was entered into the 1947 Cannes Film Festival. The film was based on a 1901 play of the same title by Roberto Bracco which had earlier been made into a 1914 silent film. The film's sets were designed by the futurist architect Virgilio Marchi.

Cast
 Vittorio De Sica as Nunzio
 Fiorella Betti as Paolina
 Jacqueline Plessis as Livia
 Enrico Glori as Paolo Nardone
 Olga Solbelli as Emilia
 Anna Corinto as Lolotta
 Luigi Pavese as Frantz Cardillo
 Giuseppe Porelli as Giovanni
 Pietro Bigerna
 Leo Dale
 Primo Di Gennaro
 Augusto Di Giovanni
 Claudio Ermelli
 Pupella Maggio 
 Annielo Mele
 Tina Pica
 Maria Luisa Reda
 Alfredo Rizzo
 Sandro Ruffini
 Agostino Salvietti
 Domenico Serra
 Ettore Zambuto

References

Bibliography
 Mancini, Elaine. Struggles of the Italian film industry during fascism, 1930-1935. UMI Research Press, 1985.

External links

1947 films
1947 drama films
Italian drama films
1940s Italian-language films
Italian black-and-white films
Films directed by Camillo Mastrocinque
Films with screenplays by Cesare Zavattini
Melodrama films
1940s Italian films